Alfredo Mazzoni (January 23, 1908 — 1986) was an Italian professional football player and coach.

External links

1908 births
1986 deaths
Italian footballers
Sportspeople from Carpi, Emilia-Romagna
Serie A players
Serie B players
Serie C players
Modena F.C. players
Genoa C.F.C. players
Inter Milan players
A.S. Roma players
A.C. Reggiana 1919 players
Ravenna F.C. players
Italian football managers
L.R. Vicenza managers
Como 1907 managers
Association football midfielders
Footballers from Emilia-Romagna